Erdenenmandal ("Jewel rise") is a small town located 73 miles north of the Arkhangai Aimag capital Tsetserleg, as well as a sum of the province.

There is a small central post office (with a phone) and also a small market area. Basic supplies can be purchased at the market area. Diesel and gasoline are available but not on a regular basis. The area may go days or longer without fuel for vehicles.

During the harsh Mongolian winters nomads from many miles away may relocate to the outskirts of Erdenemandal, setting up their gers (or yurts) in a manner to protect themselves from wind and snow.

Climate

Erdenemandal experiences a subarctic climate (Köppen Dwc) with long, dry, very cold winters and short, warm summers.

References

Populated places in Mongolia
Districts of Arkhangai Province